Die Dreisten Drei – Die Comedy WG is a German sketch comedy series, which aired from 2003 to 2008 on Sat.1 and returned in February 2012 with a new cast.

Concept 
The skits in Die Dreisten Drei center around every day situations or scenes, for example in a supermarket, in a park, on the bench or in a book shop. 
As a framework for the different skits the three are shown living together in their shared flat, usually watching TV.

Cast

Awards 
 2004, 2005, 2006: German Comedy Award as the best sketch comedy show
 2004: German Television Award as the best entertainment show
 2004: Rose d’Or as the best sketch show

See also
List of German television series

External links
 
 Official website on Constantin Entertainment
 Official website on Sat.1

2002 German television series debuts
2008 German television series endings
German comedy television series
German-language television shows
Sat.1 original programming